Teesmouth Lifeboat Station was a Royal National Lifeboat Institution (RNLI) lifeboat station, situated on the mouth of the River Tees, South Gare, North Yorkshire, England. The lifeboat station had been operating at Teesmouth for 177 years when it was closed by the RNLI in 2006. The withdrawal of the lifeboat capability from Teesmouth was subject to much criticism from the local council and the volunteers who crewed the boat, but the RNLI stated that there was an over-provision of lifeboat cover on the north-east coast.

The former lifeboat house was demolished in 2010, four years after the station had closed.

History
A lifeboat was based at Teesmouth in 1829, which was 30 years before the South Gare breakwater was built, so the location was slightly further seaward than the latter day lifeboat station. The boat allocated to Teesmouth was one of the type developed by George Palmer, who recognised the need for a self-righting boat and so added extra buoyancy. A lifeboat house was not provided until the Tees Bay Lifeboat and Shipwreck Society sourced one in 1843. In 1911, the RNLI provided a new lifeboat in response to the mounting number of shipwrecks on the east coast. This needed to be somewhere that a lifeboat could be launched and recovered no matter the weather or tide state and the new location of Teesmouth fitted the bill perfectly. The 1911 lifeboat was moored afloat until a new lifeboathouse was provided in 1914. This stayed as the main lifeboathouse until 2006 (with additional crew facilities added in 2002).

The South Gare Breakwater was completed in 1888 using slag transported from the steel and iron blast furnaces at Cargo Fleet (Middlesbrough) on the south side of the River Tees. To get the slag to the breakwater, a railway was built for ease of use. The truncated railway later became a leisure activity from which local people and tourists could take advantage of by using a sail bogey (a wagon powered by sails) to take a trip to the end of the breakwater. In the early days of sail bogey use on the line, the lifeboatmen used it to get to their lifeboathouse quickly when they were on a call-out. After it became derelict and out-of-use, the lifeboatmen used to gather in Redcar and take a bus to Teesmouth Lifeboat Station, which would cause traffic problems in Redcar.

Additionally, along where the Teesmouth Lifeboat operated, there were eight lifeboat stations along a  stretch of coast. After the closure notice came, Redcar and Cleveland Council petitioned the RNLI to keep the station open for another year after an offer of free moorings came from a local port operator.

Notable incidents
30 October 1914 - The Teesmouth boat, along with five others from the east coast (and ) helped to rescue 145 people from the shipwrecked SS Rohilla just south of Whitby Harbour.

Fleet

References

Sources

External links
Teesmouth Lifeboat Supporters Association
Teesmouth Lifeboat station from the air in 1949

Lifeboat stations in Yorkshire
Buildings and structures in North Yorkshire